Konrad Giering (born 14 September 1987 in Boksburg, Gauteng) is a South African figure skater. He is a four-time South African junior national champion, and is a two-time competitor at the Four Continents Championships.

Competitive highlights

 N = Novice level; J = Junior level

References

External links
 

1987 births
Living people
People from Boksburg
South African male single skaters
Sportspeople from Gauteng